Neophyllobius elegans is a species of mites found in Italy.

References 

 Neophyllobius elegans at eu-nomen.eu

Raphignathoidea
Animals described in 1886
Fauna of Italy